"Rollover DJ" is the second single (third in the United States) released from Australian rock band Jet's debut album, Get Born (2003). It was released on 3 November 2003 and was promoted with two different music videos. The song reached the top 40 on both the Australian ARIA Singles Chart and the UK Singles Chart.

Track listings

Australian CD single
 "Rollover DJ"
 "Are You Gonna Be My Girl" (live)
 "Take It or Leave It" (live)
 "Sgt. Major"
 "Back Door Santa"

Australian 12-inch single
A1. "Rollover DJ"
A2. "You Don't Look the Same" (demo)
B1. "Back Door Santa"
B2. "Sgt. Major"

UK CD1
 "Rollover DJ"
 "Sgt. Major"
 "Are You Gonna Be My Girl" (live)
 "Rollover DJ" (video)

UK CD2
 "Rollover DJ"
 "You Don't Look the Same" (demo)
 "Cold Hard Bitch" (live)
 "Rollover DJ" (live video from Pentonville Prison Officers Club)

Charts

Release history

References

2003 singles
2003 songs
Capitol Records singles
Elektra Records singles
Jet (band) songs
Music videos directed by Chris Milk
Song recordings produced by Dave Sardy
Songs written by Cameron Muncey
Songs written by Chris Cester
Songs written by Nic Cester